Mervin is a village in the Canadian province of Saskatchewan within the Rural Municipality of Mervin No. 499 and Census Division No. 17.

The village was named for the son of the first postmaster, Archie Gemmell.

History 
Mervin incorporated as a village on March 17, 1920.

Demographics 

See also 
 List of communities in Saskatchewan
 Villages of Saskatchewan

References

External links

Villages in Saskatchewan
Mervin No. 499, Saskatchewan
Division No. 17, Saskatchewan